The Control Group is an independent record label, founded by Nabil Ayers in  Seattle, Washington in 2002. Notable artists who have released albums on The Control Group include El Perro del Mar, Lykke Li, Cate Le Bon, Alice Boman and Wildbirds & Peacedrums.  The Control Group is also known for vinyl releases and reissues by Spinal Tap, Grandaddy, The Killers, Kings Of Leon, Giorgio Moroder and PJ Harvey.

The Control Group relocated from Seattle to Brooklyn, NY in 2008. In 2018, Ayers founded the independent record label Valley of Search to reissue his uncle Alan Braufman's album of the same name. The label has gone on to release music by Tomas Nordmark and Patricia Brennan.

Roster

Alice Boman
Enemy (band)
Alexander von Mehren
El Perro del Mar
Figurines
The Fitness
Grandaddy 
PJ Harvey
I Was A King
The Killers
Kings of Leon
Cate Le Bon
Lykke Li
The Long Winters
Giorgio Moroder
Nouela
Schoolyard Heroes
Wildbirds & Peacedrums
Spinal Tap  
Zhala
The Lonely H

See also
 List of record labels

References

External links
The Control Group's Homepage
Valley of Search Official Site

American record labels
Indie rock record labels
Alternative rock record labels
2002 establishments in the United States
Record labels established in 2002
Virtual reality companies